Martin Leo Troy (October 29, 1894 – June 26, 1965) was a Canadian politician, who represented the electoral district of Nipissing in the Legislative Assembly of Ontario from 1959 to 1965. He was a member of the Ontario Liberal Party.

Troy was born in Chatham, New Brunswick. On September 16, 1916, Troy enlisted in the Canadian Army and served in the Cyclist Platoon, Canadian Overseas Expeditionary Force. He served overseas from March 21, 1918 to March 1, 1919. He was promoted to the rank of Lieutenant and he received the British War Medal and the Victory Medal.

After the war, he moved to North Bay, Ontario, where he married Grace Catherine Barker in the Cathedrale l'Assomption on June 20, 1925. He taught English and physical education at the high school level in North Bay until his election to the legislature in 1959. Alongside caucus colleague Elmer Sopha, he was one of just two MPPs to vote against the adoption of the current Flag of Ontario.

He died in office in June 1965, days after undergoing emergency abdominal surgery.

References

External links
 

1894 births
1965 deaths
Ontario Liberal Party MPPs
People from North Bay, Ontario
People from Northumberland County, New Brunswick